Elections to Cornwall County Council were held on 6 May 1993, as part of the wider 1993 local elections. The Liberal Democrats gained control of the council, which had previously been under no overall control.

Results

|}

References
 

 
 

Cornwall
1993
1990s in Cornwall